Grant Township is a township in Lake County, Illinois, USA.  As of the 2010 census, its population was 26,523. Grant Township changed its name from Goodale Township on March 8, 1867.

Geography
Lakes in this township include Brandenburg Lake, Duck Lake, Fish Lake, Fox Lake, Long Lake, Nippersink Lake, Redhead Lake, Sullivan Lake and Wooster Lake. The streams of Eagle Creek and Squaw Creek run through this township.

Cities and towns
 Fox Lake (south half)
 Lakemoor (nourtheast quarter)
 Long Lake (west three-quarters)
 Round Lake (west quarter)
 Volo (north half)

Unincorporated towns
 Ingleside

Adjacent townships
 Antioch Township (northeast)
 Lake Villa Township (northeast)
 Avon Township (east)
 Fremont Township (southeast)
 Wauconda Township (south)
 McHenry Township, McHenry County (west)
 Burton Township, McHenry County (northwest)

Cemeteries
The township contains two cemeteries, Grant, and St. Bede Catholic Cemetery

Major highways
 U.S. Route 12
 Illinois State Route 59
 Illinois State Route 120
 Illinois State Route 134

Airports and landing strips
 Arrow Heliport
 Precision Chrome Heliport
 Fox Lake Seaplane Base

Railroad lines
 Milwaukee District/North Line

Demographics

References
 U.S. Board on Geographic Names (GNIS)
 United States Census Bureau cartographic boundary files

External links
 Grant Township official website
 US-Counties.com
 City-Data.com
 US Census
 Illinois State Archives

Townships in Lake County, Illinois
Townships in Illinois